Carrie Allen McCray (October 4, 1913 – July 25, 2008) was an African-American writer.

Early and family life
Carrie Allen was born in Lynchburg, Virginia, October 4, 1913, and raised in that city, where she came to know poet Anne Spencer, a friend of her mother. Initially educated at the Virginia Seminary Primary School, she was the ninth of ten children.  Her father, William Patterson Allen, was a lawyer and her mother, Mary Rice Hayes Allen, was a college teacher at the Virginia Seminary and College, a historically black institution now known as Virginia University of Lynchburg. She Served as its president from 1906 to 1908 after the death of her husband, Gregory W. Hayes.  He led the seminary as president until his death in 1906. When Carrie was 8 years old, her parents moved the family to Montclair, New Jersey where various black intellectuals visited, including the poet Langston Hughes. Carrie attended Spaulding Elementary School, Hillside Junior High, and Montclair High School. She received her bachelor of arts degree from Talladega College in 1935 and her master's degree in social work from New York University in 1955.

Meanwhile, in 1940 she married Winfield Scott Young, and they had a son, Winfield Scott Young Jr., before the marriage ended in divorce in 1945. She later married John H. McCray, a Florida-born journalist and civil and political rights activist in South Carolina, and moved to Columbia, South Carolina by 1986. Her second husband organized the Black Progressive Democratic Party after World War II and claimed victory for electing moderate Olin Johnson over segregationist Strom Thurmond during Massive Resistance in the 1960s.

Career
McCray wrote about the racial and gender tensions she experienced, including frightening telephone calls the Allen family received after moving into a white neighborhood in New Jersey, and her travels in the South in the 1960s with Indira, an Indian friend, particularly visiting a cousin at Auburn University. McCray took up writing seriously beginning when she was 73 years old, and in addition to encouraging younger writers, taught poetry workshops in elementary schools. She was a member of the first board of directors of the South Carolina Writers Workshop, and the namesake for its literary award. She was also a member of the Board of Governors of the South Carolina Academy of Authors.

Her published works include Ajös Means Goodbye (1966) and The Black Woman and Family Roles (1980). Her  memoir, Freedom’s Child: The Life of a Confederate General’s Black Daughter (1998) describes her return to Lynchburg to seek out her family history, as well as stories of her grandfather, CSA General (and later Virginia probate official) John R. Jones.  Her poems appeared in such magazines as Ms. and The River Styx. Ota Benga Under My Mother's Roof was her last collection of poems (edited by Kevin Simmonds) and published by University of South Carolina Press. Ota Benga was a pygmy tribal member and former slave from Africa who had been put on exhibition as an anthropological exhibit before being brought to the Virginia Seminary in Lynchburg by its president Gregory W. Hayes and who lived with the family until Ota's death in 1916. In October 2007, a theatrical adaptation of the collection (with original music by Simmonds) debuted at the Columbia Museum of Art, with McCray as narrator.

Death and legacy

McCray died on July 25, 2008, aged 94.

References

1913 births
2008 deaths
20th-century American memoirists
American women poets
Poets from South Carolina
Writers from Lynchburg, Virginia
Poets from Virginia
African-American poets
American women memoirists
20th-century American poets
20th-century American women writers
21st-century American poets
21st-century American women writers
Writers from Columbia, South Carolina
21st-century American non-fiction writers
20th-century African-American women writers
20th-century African-American writers
21st-century African-American women
21st-century African-American people